Highspire High School is an historic high school building which is located in Highspire, Dauphin County, Pennsylvania.

It was added to the National Register of Historic Places in 1990.

History and architectural features
Built in various stages between 1875 and 1939, Highspire High School is a two-story, brick building, that originally started as a four-room schoolhouse. Additions were made in 1902, 1915 and 1926; an auditorium and gymnasium were added in 1939.

The 1939 addition featured Art Deco style pilaster capitals and cornice. 

The building ceased use as a school in 1983.

It was added to the National Register of Historic Places in 1990.

References

Defunct schools in Pennsylvania
School buildings on the National Register of Historic Places in Pennsylvania
School buildings completed in 1939
Buildings and structures in Dauphin County, Pennsylvania
1875 establishments in Pennsylvania
National Register of Historic Places in Dauphin County, Pennsylvania